Dennis Culp (born April 23, 1970) is an American trombonist and singer-songwriter best known for his work with the bands Brave Saint Saturn and Five Iron Frenzy.

Career 
Culp has released one solo album, Ascents, under the name Dennis Bayne. Culp is a member of the band Roam, which began in 2010 and released one EP. He is also the CFO, owner, and Executive Producer at Singing Serpent, a firm providing music for the television advertising industry. Their clients include Toshiba, Sprint, McDonald's, and many other major companies.

Culp provided horns for the soundtrack of the third episode of Sockbaby. He also composed music for Call + Response, a 2008 documentary.

Personal life 
Culp resides in New Jersey with his wife, Melinda.

References

External links
Website for Ascents
Singing Serpent

American performers of Christian music
Living people
American ska trombonists
Male trombonists
1970 births
Musicians from Denver
Five Iron Frenzy members
21st-century American singers
21st-century trombonists